Byron Ralston (born 3 May 2000 in Australia) is an Australian rugby union player who currently plays for Connacht in Ireland. His original playing position is wing. He was named in the Force squad for the Global Rapid Rugby competition in 2020. He contributes much of his 2020 success to inspirational friend and former Olympic sprinter Levi White. He is also the boyfriend of the famous Australian Model Ariarne Lepine.

He started his first gamer for Connacht on 17 September 2022 against Ulster.

Reference list

External links
Rugby.com.au profile
itsrugby.co.uk profile

2000 births
Australian rugby union players
Living people
Rugby union wings
Western Force players
Rugby union players from Darwin, Northern Territory
Connacht Rugby players